Lucky Cisco Kid is a 1940 Western film directed by H. Bruce Humberstone and starring Cesar Romero, Mary Beth Hughes, and Dana Andrews, the latter in his film debut.

Plot summary
A gang of outlaws, led by Judge McQuade (William Robertson), are committing crimes and blaming it on the Cisco Kid (Cesar Romero), in McQuade's attempt to drive the settlers off the land and buy it himself. The Cisco Kid and Gordito (Chris-Pin Martin) eventually stop the scheme, and the Kid falls in love with widow Emily Lawrence (Evelyn Venable).

Cast
Cesar Romero as The Cisco Kid
Mary Beth Hughes as Lola
Dana Andrews as Sergeant Dunn
Evelyn Venable as Emily Lawrence
Chris-Pin Martin as Gordito
Willard Robertson as Judge McQuade
Joe Sawyer as Bill Stevens
Johnny Sheffield as Tommy Lawrence
William Royle as Sheriff
Adrian Morris as Smoketree's Partner
Lillian Yarbo as Queenie (uncredited)

External links 
 

1940 films
American black-and-white films
Films directed by H. Bruce Humberstone
1940 Western (genre) films
20th Century Fox films
American Western (genre) films
Adaptations of works by O. Henry
Cisco Kid
1940s English-language films
1940s American films